, son of Norisuke, was a kugyō (court noble) of the Edo period (1603–1868) of Japan. He held regents positions kampaku from 1682 to 1687 and from 1689 to 1690, and sesshō from 1687 to 1689. He married Norihime, daughter of Tokugawa Mitsusada, second head of Wakayama Domain, and the couple adopted Kaneka as their son.

Family
 Father: Ichijo Norisuke
 Mother: Seigen’in (1636-1717)
 Wives:
 Norihime, daughter of Tokugawa Mitsusada
 daughter of Mori Nagatsugu
 daughter of Yamashina Tokiyuki
 Adopted Son: Ichijo Kaneka

References
 

1652 births
1705 deaths
Fujiwara clan
Ichijō family